The Irene River is a tributary of the Opawica River, flowing into the Municipality of Eeyou Istchee James Bay (municipality), in Jamésie, in the administrative region of Nord-du-Québec, in Quebec, in Canada.

This river crosses successively the cantons of Fancamp and Rasles. Forestry is the main economic activity of the sector; the recreational tourism activities, second.

The southern part of the Irene River valley is served by the R1032 forest road (North-South direction) and by secondary forest roads.

The surface of the Irene River is usually frozen from early November to mid-May, however, safe ice circulation is generally from mid-November to mid-April.

Geography

Toponymy 
At various times in history, this territory has been occupied by the Attikameks, the Algonquins and the Crees. The term "Irene" is a first or last name of French origin.

The toponym "Irène River" was made official on December 5, 1968, at the Commission de toponymie du Québec, when it was created.

Notes and references

See also 

Rivers of Nord-du-Québec
Jamésie
Nottaway River drainage basin